The Methodist Church of Australasia was a Methodist denomination based in Australia. On 1 January 1902, five Methodist denominations in Australia – the Wesleyan Methodist Church, the Primitive Methodists, the Bible Christian Church, the United Methodist Free and the Methodist New Connexion Churches came together to found a new church. In polity it largely followed the Wesleyan Methodist Church. This Church established a General Conference, meeting triennially, for Australasia (which then included New Zealand) in 1875, with Annual Conferences in the States.

The church ceased to exist in 1977 when most of its congregations joined with the many congregations of the Congregational Union of Australia and the Presbyterian Church of Australia to form the Uniting Church in Australia.

There are still independent Methodist congregations in Australia, including congregations formed or impacted by Tongan immigrants. The Wesleyan Methodist Church of Australia is derived from the Wesleyan Methodist Church of America and did not join the Uniting Church in Australia.

Presidents-General
The triennial conference was led by the President-General. There were a total of 25 Presidents General over the life of the Methodist Church of Australasia, from its formation in 1902 until the Uniting Church in 1977.

See also
 Rupert Grove
Freer Helen Latham
Coralie Ling
Laura Francis (missionary)

References

Methodism in Australia
Uniting Church in Australia
Australia
Religious organizations disestablished in 1977
1902 establishments in Australia
1977 disestablishments in Australia